Xanthomonas citri is a Gram-negative, rod-shaped bacterium. Although it is harmless for humans, it is a phytopathogen, known for being the causing agent of citrus canker.

Bacterial killing via a secretion system

Xanthomonas citri uses its type IV secretion system to kill other Gram-negative bacterial species in a contact-dependent manner. The secretion of the effector proteins requires a conserved C-terminal domain, and its bacteriolytic activity is neutralized by a cognate immunity protein.

Defense against predators

Xanthomonas citri also uses type VI secretion system in defense against the predatory amoeba Dictyostelium discoideum.

References

Xanthomonadales
Bacterial citrus diseases
Bacteria described in 1989